Brusson can refer to:

Brusson, Aosta Valley, commune in Italy
Brusson, Marne, commune in France